The team jumping at the 1968 Summer Olympics took place on 27 October, at the Estadio Olímpico Universitario. The event was open to men and women.

Competition format

The team jumping competition did not use the same scores as the individual jumping, unlike the other two forms of equestrian competition. Instead, the team jumping was completely separate. Teams consisted of three horse and rider pairs. Two rounds were held, with the scores for each round for each rider and horse pair being summed to give a team score.

Results

14 teams, or 42 riders, competed.

References

Equestrian at the 1968 Summer Olympics